Caleb Johan Anderson (31 October 1910–26 June 1996) was a Swedish Social Democrat and an important adviser to Prime Minister Olof Palme, especially concerning foreign policy where he was a harsh critic of the Vietnam War, and a supporter of the Cuban Revolution. Anderson also translated books by Franz Kafka to Swedish.

Literary works
Vår otrygga värld. (1965).
I denna revolutionära epok: utrikespolitiska essäer 1966-1970. (1970).
Den globala obalansen: om olja, supermakter och imperialism. (1974).
Caleb J. Anderson: Palmes okände rådgivare: en sammanställning av Caleb J. Andersons viktigaste artiklar - urval, inledning och kommentarer av Anders Ferm. (1997).

1910 births
1996 deaths
People from Borås
Swedish Social Democratic Party politicians
Franz Kafka scholars